Robert Wilson (born October 4, 1941) is an American experimental theater stage director and playwright who has been described by The New York Times as "[America]'s – or even the world's – foremost vanguard 'theater artist. He has also worked as a choreographer, performer, painter, sculptor, video artist, and sound and lighting designer.

Wilson is best known for his collaboration with Philip Glass and Lucinda Childs on Einstein on the Beach, and his frequent collaborations with Tom Waits. In 1991, Wilson established The Watermill Center, "a laboratory for performance" on the East End of Long Island, New York, regularly working with opera and theatre companies, as well as cultural festivals. Wilson "has developed as an avant-garde artist specifically in Europe amongst its modern quests, in its most significant cultural centers, galleries, museums, opera houses and theaters, and festivals".

Early life and education
Wilson was born in Waco, Texas, the son of Loree Velma (née Hamilton) and D.M. Wilson, a lawyer. 
He had a difficult youth as the gay son of a conservative family. "When I was growing up, it was a sin to go to the theater. It was a sin if a woman wore pants. There was a prayer box in school, and if you saw someone sinning you could put their name in the prayer box, and on Fridays everyone would pray for those people whose names were in the prayer box." He was stuttering and taken to a local dance instructor called Bird "Baby" Hoffman, who helped him overcome his stutter.
After attending local schools, he studied business administration at the University of Texas from 1959 to 1962.

He moved to Brooklyn, New York in 1963 to change fields, study art and architecture. At some point he went to Arizona to study architecture with Paolo Soleri at his desert complex. Wilson found himself drawn to the work of pioneering choreographers George Balanchine, Merce Cunningham, and Martha Graham, among others. He engaged in therapeutic theater work with brain-injured and disabled children in New York. He received a BFA in architecture from the Pratt Institute in 1965. He directed a "ballet for iron-lung patients where the participants moved a fluorescent streamer with their mouths while the janitor danced dressed as Miss America". During this period, he also attended lectures by Sibyl Moholy-Nagy (widow of László Moholy-Nagy), and studied painting with artist George McNeil.

Career

Theater 

In 1968, he founded an experimental performance company, the Byrd Hoffman School of Byrds (named for a teacher who helped him manage a stutter while a teenager). With this company, he directed his first major works, beginning with 1969's The King of Spain and The Life and Times of Sigmund Freud. He began to work in opera in the early 1970s, creating Einstein on the Beach with composer Philip Glass and choreographer Lucinda Childs. This work brought the artists worldwide renown. Following Einstein, Wilson worked increasingly with major European theaters and opera houses. For the New York debut of his first opera, the Metropolitan Opera allowed Wilson to rent the house on a Sunday, when they did not have a production, but would not produce the work.

In 1970, Wilson and a group of collaborators, including choreographer Andy deGroat and the dancer and actor Sheryl Sutton, devised the "silent opera" Deafman Glance in Iowa City, where it premiered at the Center for New Performing Arts on December 15. The large cast of the premiere production of Deafman Glance included Raymond Andrews and Ana Mendieta. The show subsequently traveled to the Nancy Festival in France and to the Brooklyn Academy of Music. It later opened in Paris, championed by the designer Pierre Cardin. The Surrealist poet Louis Aragon loved it and published a letter to the Surrealist poet André Breton (who had died in 1966), in which he praised Wilson as: "What we, from whom Surrealism was born, dreamed would come after us and go beyond us". In 1975, Wilson dissolved the Byrds and started to use professional actors.

In 1983/84, Wilson planned a performance for the 1984 Summer Olympics, the CIVIL warS: A Tree Is Best Measured When It Is Down; the complete work was to have been 12 hours long, in 6 parts. The production was only partially completed; the full event was cancelled by the Olympic Arts Festival, due to insufficient funds. In 1986, the Pulitzer Prize jury unanimously selected the CIVIL warS for the drama prize, but the supervisory board rejected the choice and gave no drama award that year.

In 1990 alone, Wilson created four new productions in four different West German cities: Shakespeare's King Lear in Frankfurt, Chekhov's Swan Song in Munich, an adaptation of Virginia Woolf's Orlando in West Berlin, and The Black Rider a collaboration by Wilson, Tom Waits and William S. Burroughs, in Hamburg.

In 1997, he was awarded the Europe Theatre Prize.

In 1998, Wilson staged August Strindberg's A Dream Play, first in Stockholm, then in Nice, London, and New York.

In 2010 Wilson was working on a new stage musical with composer (and long-time collaborator) Tom Waits and the Irish playwright, Martin McDonagh. His theatrical production of John Cage's Lecture on Nothing, which was commissioned for a celebration of the Cage centenary at the 2012 Ruhrtriennale, had its U.S. premiere in Royce Hall, UCLA, by the Center for the Art of Performance. Wilson performed Lectures on Nothing in its Australian premiere at the 2019 Supersense festival at the Arts Centre Melbourne.

In 2013 Wilson, in collaboration with Mikhail Baryshnikov and co-starring Willem Dafoe, developed The Old Woman, an adaptation of the work by the Russian author Daniil Kharms. The play premiered at MIF13, Manchester International Festival. Wilson wrote that he and Baryshnikov had discussed creating a play together for years, perhaps based on a Russian text. The final production included dance, light, singing and bilingual monologue.

Since 1999, Wilson has premiered nine theatrical works in Berlin. By contrast, as of 2013, his last commission in the United States was 21 years ago.

As of 2010, he continued to direct revivals of his most celebrated productions, including The Black Rider in London, San Francisco, Sydney, Australia, and Los Angeles; The Temptation of St. Anthony in New York and Barcelona; Erwartung in Berlin; Madama Butterfly at the Bolshoi Opera in Moscow; and Wagner's Der Ring des Nibelungen at Théâtre du Châtelet in Paris.

Wilson also directs all Monteverdi operas for the opera houses of La Scala in Milan and the Palais Garnier in Paris.

In 2021 Wilson directed a revival of Shakespeare's The Tempest at the Ivan Vazov National Theatre in Sofia, Bulgaria.

In 2022 he directed UBU, a theatrical performance, premiered at Es Baluard Museu in Palma.

Visual art and design 
In addition to his work for the stage, Wilson has created sculpture, drawings, and furniture designs. Exhibited in December 1976 at the Paula Cooper Gallery, Wilson's storyboards were described by one critic as "serial art, equivalent to the slow-motion tempo of [Wilson's] theatrical style. In drawing after drawing after drawing, a detail is proposed, analyzed, refined, redefined, moved through various positions."
He won the Golden Lion at the 1993 Venice Biennale for a sculptural installation. 
In 2004, Ali Hossaini offered Wilson a residency at the television channel LAB HD. Since then Wilson, with producer Esther Gordon and later with Matthew Shattuck, has produced dozens of high-definition videos known as the Voom Portraits. Collaborators on this well-received project included the composer Michael Galasso, the late artist and designer Eugene Tsai, fashion designer Kevin Santos, and lighting designer Urs Schönebaum. In addition to celebrity subjects, sitters have included royalty, animals, Nobel Prize winners and hobos.

In 2011, Wilson designed an art park dedicated to the Finnish designer Tapio Wirkkala (1915–1985), situated in the Arabianranta district of Helsinki. His plans for the rectangular park feature a central square divided into nine equally sized fields separated by bushes. Each field will be installed with objects related to the home. For example, one unit will consist of a small fireplace surrounded by stones that serve as seating. The park will be lit by large, lightbox-style lamps build into the ground and by smaller ones modelled on ordinary floor lamps.

In 2013 American pop singer Lady Gaga announced that she would collaborate with Wilson as part of her ARTPOP project. He subsequently designed the set for her 2013 MTV Video Music Awards performance. Wilson also suggested that Gaga pose for his Voom Portraits. Knowing he had an upcoming residency as guest curator at the Louvre, Wilson chose themes from the museum's collection, all dealing with death. They shot the videos in a London studio over three days, Gaga standing for 14 or 15 hours at a time. Called "Living Rooms," the resulting exhibition included two video works: one inspired by Jacques-Louis David's The Death of Marat, hung in the painting galleries, and another in which Lady Gaga brings to life a painting by Ingres. In the Louvre's auditorium, Wilson hosted and took part in a series of performances, conversations, film screenings, and discussions. The centerpiece of the residency is a room filled with objects from the artist's personal collection in New York, including African masks, a Shaker chair, ancient Chinese ceramics, shoes worn by Marlene Dietrich and a photo of Wilson and Glass taken in the early 1980s by Robert Mapplethorpe.

Personal life
Wilson lives in New York. As of 2000, he estimated that he "spends 10 days a year at his apartment in New York". For many years he was romantically involved with Andy de Groat, a dancer and choreographer with whom he collaborated in the 1970s.

Style
Wilson is known for pushing the boundaries of theatre. His works are noted for their austere style, very slow movement, and often extreme scale in space or in time. The Life and Times of Joseph Stalin was a 12-hour performance, while KA MOUNTain and GUARDenia Terrace was staged on a mountaintop in Iran and lasted seven days.

Language
Language is one of the most important elements of theatre and Robert Wilson feels at home with commanding it in many different ways. Wilson's impact on this part of theatre alone is immense. Arthur Holmberg, professor of theatre at Brandeis University, says that "In theatre, no one has dramatized the crisis of language with as much ferocious genius as Robert Wilson." Wilson makes it evident in his work that whats and whys of language are terribly important and cannot be overlooked. Tom Waits, acclaimed songwriter and collaborator with Wilson, said this about Wilson's unique relationship with words:

Words for Bob are like tacks on the kitchen floor in the dark of night and you're barefoot. So Bob clears a path he can walk through words without getting hurt. Bob changes the values and shapes of words. In some sense they take on more meaning; in some cases, less.

Wilson shows the importance of language through all of his works and in many varying fashions. He credits his reading of the work of Gertrude Stein and listening to recordings of her speaking with "changing [his] way of thinking forever." Wilson directed three of Stein's works in the 1990s: Doctor Faustus Lights the Lights (1992), Four Saints in Three Acts (1996), and Saints and Singing (1998).

Wilson considers language and, down to its very ingredients, words, as a sort of "a social artifact". Not only does language change with time but it changes with person, with culture. Using his experience of working with mentally handicapped children and enlisting the collaboration of Christopher Knowles, a renowned autistic poet, has allowed Wilson to attack language from many views. Wilson embraces this by often "juxtaposing levels of diction – Miltonic opulence and contemporary ling, crib poetry and pre-verbal screams" in an attempt to show his audience how elusive language really is and how ever-changing it can be. Visually showing words is another method Wilson uses to show the beauty of language. Often his set designs, program covers, and posters are graffiti'd with words. This allows the audience to look at the "language itself" rather than "the objects and meanings it refers to.".

The lack of language is essential to Wilson's work as well. In the same way an artist uses positive and negative space, Wilson uses noise and silence. In working on a production of King Lear, Wilson inadvertently describes his necessity of silence:

The way actors are trained here is wrong. All they think about is interpreting a text. They worry about how to speak words and know nothing about their bodies. You see that by the way they walk. They don't understand the weight of a gesture in space. A good actor can command an audience by moving one finger.

This emphasis on silence is fully explored in some of his works. Deafman Glance is a play without words, and his adaptation of Heiner Müller's play  contained a fifteen-minute wordless prologue. Holmberg describes these works stating,

Language does many things and does them well. But we tend to shut our eyes to what language does not do well. Despite the arrogance of words – they rule traditional theatre with an iron fist – not all experience can be translated into a linguistic code.

Celebrated twentieth century playwright Eugène Ionesco said that Wilson "surpassed Beckett" because "[Wilson's] silence is a silence that speaks". This silence onstage may be unnerving to audience members but serves a purpose of showing how important language is by its absence. It is Wilson's means of answering his own question: "Why is it no one looks? Why is it no one knows how to look? Why does no one see anything on stage?"

Another technique Wilson uses is that of what words can mean to a particular character. His piece, I was sitting on my patio this guy appeared I thought I was hallucinating, features only two characters, both of whom deliver the same stream-of-consciousness monologue. In the play's first production one character was "aloof, cold, [and] precise" while the other "brought screwball comedy … warmth and color … playful[ness]". The different emphases and deliveries brought to the monologue two different meanings; "audiences found it hard to believe they heard the same monologue twice." Rather than tell his audience what words are supposed to mean, he opens them up for interpretation, presenting the idea that "meanings are not tethered to words like horses to hitching posts."

Movement
Movement is a key element in Wilson's work. As a dancer, he sees the importance of the way an actor moves onstage and knows the weight that movement bears. When speaking of his "play without words" rendition of Ibsen's When We Dead Awaken, Wilson says:

I do movement before we work on the text. Later we'll put text and movement together. I do movement first to make sure it's strong enough to stand on its own two feet without words. The movement must have a rhythm and structure of its own. It must not follow the text. It can reinforce a text without illustrating it. What you hear and what you see are two different layers. When you put them together, you create another texture.

With such an emphasis on movement, Wilson even tailors his auditions around the necessity of it. In his auditions, "Wilson often does an elaborate movement sequence" and "asks the actor to repeat it." Thomas Derrah, an actor in the CIVIL warS, found the audition process to be baffling: "When I went in, [Wilson] asked me to walk across the room on a count of 31, sit down on a count of 7, put my hand to my forehead on a count of 59. I was mystified by the whole process". To further cement the importance of movement in Wilson's works, Seth Goldstein, another actor in the CIVIL warS, stated "every movement from the moment I walked onto the platform until I left was choreographed to the second. During the scene at table all I did was count movements. All I thought about was timing."

When it comes time to add the text in with movement, there is still much work to be done. Wilson pays close attention to the text and still makes sure there is enough "space around a text" for the audience to soak it up. At this point, the actors know their movements and the time in which they are executed, allowing Wilson to tack the actions onto specific pieces of text. His overall goal is to have the rhythm of the text differ from that of the movement so his audience can see them as two completely different pieces, seeing each as what it is. When in the text/movement stage, Wilson often interrupts the rehearsal, saying things like "Something is wrong. We have to check your scripts to see if you put the numbers in the right place." He goes on to explain the importance of this:

I know it's hell to separate text and movement and maintain two different rhythms. It takes time to train yourself to keep tongue and body working against each other. But things happen with the body that have nothing to do with what we say. It's more interesting if the mind and the body are in two different places, occupying different zones of reality.

These rhythms keep the mind on its toes, consciously and subconsciously taking in the meanings behind the movement and how it is matching up with the language.

Similar to Wilson's use of the lack of language in his works, he also sees the importance that a lack of movement can have. In his production of Medea, Wilson arranged a scene in which the lead singer stood still during her entire aria while many others moved around her. Wilson recalls that "she complained that if I didn't give her any movements, no one would notice her. I told her if she knew how to stand, everyone would watch her. I told her to stand like a marble statue of a goddess who had been standing in the same spot for a thousand years". Allowing an actor to have such stage presence without ever saying a word is very provocative, which is precisely what Wilson means to accomplish with any sense of movement he puts on the stage.

Lighting
Wilson believes that "the most important part of theatre" is light. He is concerned with how images are defined onstage, and this is related to the light of an object or tableau. He feels that the lighting design can really bring the production to life. The set designer for Wilson's the CIVIL warS, Tom Kamm, describes his philosophy: "a set for Wilson is a canvas for the light to hit like paint." He explains, "If you know how to light, you can make shit look like gold. I paint, I build, I compose with light. Light is a magic wand."

Wilson is "the only major director to get billing as a lighting designer" and is recognized by some as "the greatest light artist of our time". He designs with light to be flowing rather than an off-and-on pattern, thus making his lighting "like a musical score." Wilson's lighting designs feature "dense, palpable textures" and allow "people and objects to leap out from the background. In his design for Quartett, Wilson used four hundred light cues in a span of only ninety minutes.

He is a perfectionist, persisting to achieve every aspect of his vision. A fifteen-minute monologue in Quartett took two days for him to light while a single hand gesture took nearly three hours. This attention to detail expresses his conviction that, "light is the most important actor on stage." In a conversation with theatre expert Octavian Saiu, Wilson was asked whether he is disturbed by the fact that his style is often imitated. His response was that "the world is a library", and therefore every artist is free to borrow from other artists.

Props
Wilson's interest in design extends to the props in his productions, which he designs and sometimes participates in constructing. Whether it is furniture, a light bulb, or a giant crocodile, Wilson treats each as a work of art in its own right. He demands that a full-scale model of each prop be constructed before the final one is made, in order "to check proportion, balance, and visual relationships" on stage. Once he has approved the model, the crew builds the prop, and Wilson is "renowned for sending them back again and again and again until they satisfy him". He is so strict in his attention to detail that when Jeff Muscovin, his technical director for Quartett, suggested they use an aluminum chair with a wood skin rather than a completely wooden chair, Wilson replied:

No, Jeff, I want wood chairs. If we make them out of aluminum, they won't sound right when they fall over and hit the floor. They'll sound like metal, not wood. It will sound false. Just make sure you get strong wood. And no knots.

Such attention to detail and perfectionism usually resulted in an expensive collection of props. "Curators regard them as sculptures" and the props have been sold for prices ranging from "$4,500 to $80,000."

Exhibitions
Extensive retrospectives have been presented at the Centre Georges Pompidou in Paris (1991) and the Boston Museum of Fine Arts (1991). He has presented installations at the Stedelijk Museum Amsterdam, Museum Boymans-van Beuningen, Rotterdam (1993), London's Clink Street Vaults (1995), Neue Nationalgalerie (2003), and the Solomon R. Guggenheim Museum in New York and the Guggenheim Museum Bilbao. His tribute to Isamu Noguchi was exhibited at the Seattle Art Museum and his Voom Portraits exhibition traveled to Hamburg, Milan, Miami, and Philadelphia. In 2012, Times Square Arts invited Wilson to show selections from his three-minute video portraits on more than twenty digital screens that lined Times Square. In 2013 he participated at the White House Biennial / Thessaloniki Biennale 4.

Wilson is represented exclusively and worldwide by RW Work, Ltd. (New York), and his gallerist in New York City is Paula Cooper Gallery.

The Watermill Center
In 1991 Wilson established The Watermill Center on the site of a former Western Union laboratory on the East End of Long Island, New York. Originally styled as "a laboratory for performance", The Watermill Center operates year-round artist residencies, public education programs, exhibitions, and performances. The center is situated within a  campus of gardens and designed landscape, and contains numerous works of art collected by Wilson.

Europe Theatre Prize 
In 1997 he was awarded the V Europe Theatre Prize, in Taormina, with the following motivation:The Jury of the fifth Europe Theatre Prize has unanimously awarded the Prize to Robert Wilson in recognition of his thirty years' work aimed at creating a personal reinvention of scenic art that has overturned the temporal dimension and retraced the spatial one. He refused to render a mere production of reality and offered an abstract or informal vision of the text and also redefined the roles, whenever possible, through global intervention in the creation of his performances where he was author, director, performer, scenographer and magic light designer. Architect by profession, the artist pursed an indisciplinary language that did not ignore the visual arts in enhancing the importance of the image and, restoring the support of music, he approached dance and simultaneously attempted to find a pure harmonious value in the spoken word, in an ideal tension towards a form of total theatre.

It has been said that his works can be considered part of a single opus in continual evolution that constitutes the synthesis. During his career Wilson has confronted himself with different genres and drawn them closer thanks to the conformity of language. He has executed classical works and specially written works and for this reasons he has stimulated the interest of eminent writers, such as William Burroughs and Heiner Müller establishing a particular bond with him.

He has dedicated himself to teaching non theatrical literary works often adapted into monologues interpreted by eminent actors, such as Madeleine Renaud and Marianne Hoppe. He has ventured into the production of opera and ballet, he has created musicals sui generis in collaboration with illustrious emerging personalities, he has promoted performances especially with Christopher Knowles, he has directed spectacular fashion parades. His prolific activity as designer and visual artist can be seen in his paintings, sculptures, installations, graphic works, exhibitions. He was awarded the major prize at the Venice Biennale.

Nothing new can be achieved without changing the conceptions of organisation. He was a decisive promoter of coproduction of festivals since the '70s, of the creation of prototype-performances that could be translated in various nations with new casts, and also of the creation of serial works to be completed later in production studios. Thanks are due to him for the embrace between different nations, languages, styles and traditions.

Even when using bigger and bigger and more and more international teams of collaborators Wilson has never renounced making his own imprint of perfectionist in a developing opera. He has to be accredited with the Watermill Centre, centre of experimentation and training where his work as a teacher has helped him in retain an inexhaustible flow of fresh ideas from the contact with the young people.

Legacy and awards
 1971 and 1980 Guggenheim Fellowship awards
 1971 Drama Desk Award for Outstanding Director for Deafman Glance
 1975 Rockefeller Foundation Fellowship
 1981 Asian Cultural Council Fellowship
 1986 Nomination for the Pulitzer Prize for Drama
 1987 Subject of documentary Robert Wilson and the Civil Wars, directed by Howard Brookner
 1993 Golden Lion for Sculpture from the Venice Biennale
 1996 The Dorothy and Lillian Gish Prize
 1997 Europe Theatre Prize
 2000 Election to the American Academy of Arts and Letters
 2001 National Design Award for Lifetime Achievement
 2002 Commandeur des arts et des lettres
 2005 Honorary doctorate from University of Toronto
 2009 Hein Heckroth Prize – Lifetime Achievement for Scenic Design
 2009 Medal for Arts and Sciences of the city of Hamburg
 2009 Trophée des Arts Award, Alliance française
 2013 Honorary doctorate from the City University of New York
 2013 Olivier Award: Best New Opera for Einstein on the Beach
 2013 Paez Medal of Art from VAEA

Works 

 The King of Spain, 1969
 The Life and Times of Sigmund Freud, 1969
 Deafman Glance (film) (with Raymond Andrews), 1970
 KA MOUNTAIN AND GUARDenia TERRACE: a story about a family and some people changing, 1972
 The Life and Times of Joseph Stalin, 1973
 A Letter for Queen Victoria, 1974
 Einstein on the Beach (with Philip Glass), 1976
 I Was Sitting on My Patio This Guy Appeared I Thought I Was Hallucinating (with Lucinda Childs), 1977
 Death Destruction & Detroit, 1979
 Edison (play), 1979
 The Golden Windows (Die Goldenen Fenster), 1979
 Dialogue/Curious George (play), 1980
 Stations (play), 1982
 The Civil Wars: A Tree Is Best Measured When It Is Down, 1984
 Shakespeare's King Lear, 1985
 Heiner Müller's Hamletmachine, 1986
 Euripides' Alcestis, 1986–1987
 Death Destruction & Detroit II, 1987
 Heiner Müller's , 1987
 Le martyre de Saint Sébastien, 1988
 Orlando (adapted by Darryl Pinckney from the novel by Virginia Woolf), 1989
 Louis Andriessen's De Materie, 1989
 The Black Rider (with William S. Burroughs and Tom Waits), 1990
 Richard Wagner's Parsifal, Hamburg, 1991
 Alice (musical, with Tom Waits and Paul Schmidt), 1992
 Gertrude Stein's Doctor Faustus Lights the Lights, Hebbel Theatre (Berlin) 1992
 Skin, Meat, Bone (with Alvin Lucier), 1994
 The Meek Girl (based on a story by Fyodor Dostoevsky), 1994
 Timerocker (with Lou Reed), 1997
 Persephone (texts by Homer, Brad Gooch, Maita di Niscemi, music by Gioachino Rossini and Philip Glass), Taormina, 1997
 O Corvo Branco (with Philip Glass), Teatro Camões (Lisbon), 1998
 Monsters of Grace (with Philip Glass), 1998
 Lohengrin for the Metropolitan Opera, 1998
 Wings on Rock for the Teatro della Fortuna, Fano, 1998
 Bertolt Brecht's The Flight Across the Ocean for the Berliner Ensemble, 1998
 The Days Before – Death Destruction & Detroit III, (with Ryuichi Sakamoto), Lincoln Center 1999
 Richard Wagner's Der Ring des Nibelungen, Zurich Opera
 POEtry, (with Lou Reed), 2000
 14 Stations (installation), 2000
 Hot Water (multimedia concert), (with Tzimon Barto), 2000
 Woyzeck (with Tom Waits), 2000
 Persephone, 2001
 Richard Strauss's Die Frau ohne Schatten, Opéra National de Paris (Opéra Bastille), 2002
Isamu Noguchi exhibition, 2003
The Temptation of Saint Anthony (with Bernice Johnson Reagon) Opéra National de Paris, 2003Aida, Royal Opera House (Covent Garden), 2003I La Galigo, 2004
 Jean de La Fontaine's The Fables, 2005
 Ibsen's Peer Gynt, 2005 (in Norway)
 Büchner's Leonce and Lena VOOM Portraits, exhibition, 2007 at ACE Gallery in Los Angeles, CA
 Brecht's The Threepenny Opera, Berliner Ensemble, 2007
 Beckett's Happy Days, 2008
 Rumi, Polish National Opera, 2008
 Faust for the Polish National Opera, 2008
 Sonnets (based on Shakespeare's sonnets with music by Rufus Wainwright), Berliner Ensemble, 2009
 [KOOL – Dancing in my mind], (a performance/portrait of choreographer and dancer Suzushi Hanayagi), 2009
 Carl Maria von Weber's Der Freischütz, Festspielhaus Baden-Baden, conductor Thomas Hengelbrock, 2009
 Beckett's Krapp's Last Tape, 2009
 L'Orfeo, by Claudio Monteverdi, La Scala, Milan, 2009
 Káťa Kabanová, by Leoš Janáček, Národní divadlo, Prague, 2010
 Věc Makropulos, by Karel Čapek, Stavovské divadlo, Prague, 2010
 2010 : Oh les beaux jours de Samuel Beckett, Théâtre de l'Athénée Louis-Jouvet
 The Life and Death of Marina Abramović, with Marina Abramović, Manchester International Festival, July 9–16, 2011, The Lowry, Manchester, UK
 Il ritorno d'Ulisse in patria, by Claudio Monteverdi, La Scala, Milan 2011
 Claude Debussy's Pelléas et Mélisande, Teatro Real de Madrid, 2011
 Mind gap exhibition, Norwegian Museum of Science and Technology, 2011
 Peter Pan, with CocoRosie at the Berliner Ensemble, April 2013
 The Life and Death of Marina Abramović, with Marina Abramović, Luminato Festival, Bluma Appel Theatre, Toronto, June 14–17, 2013
 The Old Woman (play), with Willem Dafoe and Mikhail Baryshnikov, Manchester International Festival, Palace Theatre, Manchester, UK, July 2013
 1914, based on The Last Days of Mankind by Karl Kraus and The Good Soldier Švejk by Jaroslav Hašek, Estates Theatre, Prague, Czech Republic, April 2014
 Rhinoceros, by Eugène Ionesco, Teatrul Național Marin Sorescu, Craiova, Romania, July 2014
 Faust I and II with Herbert Grönemeyer at the Berliner Ensemble, April 2015
 Adam's Passion with Arvo Pärt, Noblessner Foundry, Tallinn, Estonia, May 2015
 Pushkin's Fairy Tales (play) (with CocoRosie), Theatre of Nations, Moscow, Russia, June 2015
 La Traviata with Teodor Currentzis, Perm Opera and Ballet Theatre, Perm, Russia, November 2016
 Hamletmachine, by Heiner Müller and Robert Wilson (with the performers of the Accademia Nazionale di Arte Drammatica Silvio D'Amico), Auditorium Parco della Musica, Rome, 2017
 Mary Said What She Said with Isabelle Huppert, Wiener Festwochen, Vienna, Austria, May 2019

 Messiah (2020)
 The Tempest, Ivan Vazov National Theatre, Sofia, Bulgaria, November 2021

 DVD (Operas) 

 Orphée et Eurydice by Christoph Willibald Gluck. Théâtre du Châtelet, Paris, 1999. Orchestre Révolutionnaire et Romantique & Monteverdi Choir, John Eliot Gardiner, cond.; Magdalena Kožená (Orphée); Madeline Bender (Eurydice); Patricia Petibon (Amour); Arthaus Musik #100062 (2000)/ Warner Classics # 16577 (2009)
 Alceste by Christoph Willibald Gluck. Théâtre du Châtelet, Paris, 1999. English Baroque Soloists & Monteverdi Choir, John Eliot Gardiner, cond.; Anne Sofie von Otter (Alceste), Paul Groves (Admète), Dietrich Henschel (High Priest and Hercules), Yann Beuron (Evandre), Ludovic Tézier (A Herald and Apollo), Frédéric Caton (Oracle and Infernal God), Hjördis Thébault (Coryphée). Image Entertainment ID9307RADVD (2000) / Warner Classics #16570 (2009)
 Madama Butterfly by Giacomo Puccini, 2003. Netherlands Opera Chorus, Netherlands Philharmonic Orchestra Edo de Waart, cond.; Richard Stilwell (Sharpless), Catherine Keen (Suzuki), Martin Thompson (Pinkerton), Cheryl Barker (Butterfly), Peter Blanchet (Goro), Anneleen Bijnen (Kate Pinkerton). Kultur Video # 937 (2003)
 L'Orfeo by Claudio Monteverdi, La Scala, Milan 2009. Milan Teatro alla Scala Orchestra, Concerto Italiano, Rinaldo Alessandrini, cond.; Georg Nigl (Orfeo); Roberta Invernizzi (La Musica/Euridice/Eco); Sara Mingardo (Sylvia/Speranza); Luigi de Donato (Caronte); Raffaella Milanesi (Proserpina); Giovanni Battista Parodi (Plutone); Furio. OPUS ARTE 1044
 Pelléas et Mélisande by Claude Debussy. Paris, 2012. Orchestre de l'Opéra national de Paris, Philippe Jordan, cond.; Chœur de l'Opéra national de Paris, Patrick Marie Aubert. Stéphane Degout (Pelléas); Elena Tsallagova (Mélisande); Vincent Le Texier (Golaud); Anne Sofie von Otter (Geneviève); Franz-Josef Selig (Arkel); Julie Mathevet (The little Yniold); Jérôme Varnier (Un berger, le médecin). Naive # 2159

References

Further reading
 Brecht, Stefan. 1978. The Theatre of Visions: Robert Wilson. Frankfurt: Suhrkamp.
 Brockett, Oscar G. and Franklin J. Hildy. 2003. History of the Theatre. Ninth edition, International edition. Boston: Allyn and Bacon. .
 Gussow, Mel. 1998. Theatre on the Edge. New York: Applause.
 Macián, José Enrique, Sue Jane Stocker, and Jörn Weisbrodt, eds. 2011. The Watermill Center – A Laboratory for Performance: Robert Wilson's Legacy. Stuttgart: DACO-VERLAG. .
 Morey, Miguel and Carmen Pardo. 2002. Robert Wilson. Barcelona: Edicion Poligrafa S.A.
 Otto-Bernstein, Katharina. 2006. Absolute Wilson: The Biography. New York: Prestel.
 Quadri, Franco, Franco Bertoni, and Robert Stearns. 1998. Robert Wilson. New York: Rizzoli.
Schroeder, Jonathan, Stenport, Anna W., and Szalczer, Ezster (eds.) (2019), August Strindberg and Visual Culture: The Emergence of Optical Modernity in Image, Text and Theatre, London: Bloomsbury.
 Shyer, Laurence. 1989. Robert Wilson And His Collaborators. New York: Theatre Communications Group.
 Weber, Carl, ed. & trans. 1989. Explosion of a Memory: Writings by Heiner Müller. By Heiner Müller. New York: Performing Arts Journal Publications. .

film, theatre
 Katharina Otto-Bernstein, Absolute Wilson 
Will Bond Bob.''one-man play, 1998
Carl von Karstedt Robert Wilson, Die Schönheit des Geheimnisvollen (The Beauty of the Mysterious) , ARTE TV, documentary, 52 minutes, 2021

External links 
 
 RobertWilson.com Official site
 Absolute Wilson documentary film site 
 Interview with Robert Wilson by Bruce Duffie, September 6, 1990
 Robert Wilson: Video Portraits of Lady Gaga Louvre, Galerie Thaddaeus Ropac, Watermill Center NY, Hirshhorn Museum and Sculpture Garden, Bernier/Eliades gallery, 2013–2015 by art critic Kostas Prapoglou.
 Finding aid to Robert Wilson papers at Columbia University. Rare Book & Manuscript Library.

1941 births
20th-century American dramatists and playwrights
American lighting designers
American opera directors
American theatre directors
Bessie Award winners
American gay writers
American LGBT dramatists and playwrights
LGBT people from Texas
Living people
Members of the Academy of Arts, Berlin
People from Waco, Texas
Postmodern theatre
Pratt Institute alumni
Scenographers
Writers from Texas